Nagash may refer to

Negash, a village in northern Ethiopia, with important Muslim associations
Stian Hinderson, a Norwegian musician known by his stage name "Nagash" 
Nagash (Warhammer) - a character in the fictional Warhammer Fantasy game setting
Nagash painting, a form of Arabic art